The Trentino Tyrolean People's Party (PPTT; , TVP) was a regionalist Christian-democratic Italian political party based in Trentino which was active from 1948 to 1982.

History
The PPTT was formed on 25 July 1948 as the transformation into political party of the Association Autonomistic Regional Studies (Associazione Studi Autonomistici Regionali, ASAR). ASAR, whose slogan was "integral autonomy from Borghetto to Brenner", was a group which fought successfully for the establishment of the Trentino-Alto Adige/Südtirol as special statute Region.

In the 1948 provincial election the party won 16.8% of the vote and became a junior partner in Christian Democracy-led government. The PPTT, whose longstanding leader was Enrico Pruner, became the sister-party of the South Tyrolean People's Party, although the two were independent parties.

In 1982 a split between the conservative wing, led by Franco Tretter, and the centrist wing of the party, led by longstanding leader Enrico Pruner. The first group retained the name of the party but later changed it to Trentino Tyrolean Autonomist Union, while second one took the name of Integral Autonomy. In 1988 the two groups merged into the Trentino Tyrolean Autonomist Party.

References

Sources
"Autonomists in Trentino", an essay by Franco Panizza
Provincial Council of Trento – Legislatures
Trentino Alto-Adige Region – Elections
Provincial Government of Trento – Elections
Cattaneo Institute – Archive of Election Data
Parties and Elections in Europe – Province of Trento
Ministry of the Interior – Historical Archive of Elections

Political parties in Trentino
Christian democratic parties in Italy
Catholic political parties